Hurricane Adrian was an intense, albeit short-lived early-season Category 4 hurricane that brought heavy rainfall and high waves to Mexico in June 2011 during the 2011 Pacific hurricane season. Adrian originated from an area of disturbed weather which had developed during the course of early June, off the Pacific coast of Mexico. On June 7, it acquired a sufficiently organized structure with deep convection to be classified as a tropical cyclone, and the National Hurricane Center (NHC) designated it as Tropical Depression One-E, the first one of 2011. It further strengthened to be upgraded into a tropical storm later that day. Adrian moved rather slowly; briefly recurving northward after being caught in the steering winds. After steady intensification, it was upgraded into a hurricane on June 9. The storm subsequently entered a phase of rapid intensification, developing a distinct eye with good outflow in all quadrants. Followed by this period of rapid intensification, it obtained sustained winds fast enough to be considered a major hurricane and reached its peak intensity as a category 4 hurricane that evening.

Adrian weakened throughout June 10 to June 12 as increased vertical wind shear persisted around its vicinity. It was downgraded into a tropical storm on June 11 as the once organized structure deteriorated, further so into a tropical depression the following day. Adrian subsequently decayed into a remnant low-pressure area with very little convection, all dislocated to the northeast of the low-level center. Degeneration continued and Adrian disintegrated into a swirl of low clouds, drifting due to the northwest. Since Adrian stayed at sea, its effects along coastlines were limited. Damages, if any, remains unknown, and no fatalities were reported as a result of the Adrian.

Meteorological history

By June 3, a surface low formed off an area of disturbed weather that existed several hundred miles south-southeast of Acapulco, Mexico during the first few days of June. Slow development of this system was anticipated by the National Hurricane Center (NHC). Remaining nearly stationary, it managed to produce a few disorganized showers and thunderstorms. Favorable environmental conditions allowed gradual organization, and convection became better defined on June 5. It subsequently acquired sufficiently organized structure to be recognized as a tropical cyclone and NHC initiated advisories on the newly formed tropical depression One-E at 1200 UTC, June 7 while it was located around 365 mi (590 km) south of Acapulco, Mexico.

Upper-level wind shear in its vicinity were minimal, which was also conducive for intensification. As a result, the tropical depression continued to become better organized, with a large rainband flaring up to the west of the circulation. Based on the improved appearance on satellite imagery, it is estimated the depression intensified into Tropical Storm Adrian at 0000 UTC on June 8, twelve hours after formation. Briefly caught within light steering winds, Adrian tracked toward the north-northwest. Continuing to increase in deep convection, NHC re-assessed the intensity to 60 mph (95 km/h) at around 0900 UTC. By nightfall, the eye-like feature developed into a central dense overcast (CDO), and at around 0000 UTC on June 9, the NHC upgraded Adrian to a minimal hurricane as it attained sustained winds of 80 mph (130 km/h).

Later that day, a well-defined eye formed beneath the CDO and the surrounding cloud tops reached below , indicating intensification is present. Adrian rapidly deepened, and over the following 24 hours, it is estimated by satellite observations that winds increased from 80 mph (120 km/h) to 140 mph (240 km/h) and its barometric pressure decreased by 43 mbar (hPa; 1.27 inHg), going from a category 1 to a category 4 hurricane on the Saffir–Simpson Hurricane Scale (SSHS). During that time, its eye became more distinct, and the upper-level outflow was symmetrical.

Contrary to previous predictions by the NHC, Adrian continued to intensify, reaching its peak intensity at around 0000 UTC on June 10 while located about 320 mi (515 km) south-southwest of Manzanillo, Mexico. When Adrian peaked, it had maximum sustained winds of 140 mph (220 km/h) and a barometric pressure estimated at 944 mbar (hPa; 27.88 inHg). Later that morning, convection associated with the Adrian had lessened. Initially, NHC suggested slow weakening could occur due to progressively cooler water temperatures. By then, Adrian also began moving into a more stable environment with stronger westerly wind shear, which is highly unfavorable for the sustaining tropical cyclones. By June 11, Adrian's eye completely disappeared on satellite imagery, and it no longer maintained its symmetrical structure.

Deteriorating faster than anticipated due to an unexpected increase in wind shear, Adrian weakened back into a tropical storm around 1800 UTC on June 11. Soon enough, Adrian degenerated into a tight swirl of low-level clouds with very limited deep convection. Intermittent bursts of deep convection kept satellite intensity estimates at 45 mph (65 km/h), briefly halting the weakening process. Weakening resumed and Adrian degenerated into a tropical depression six hours later, and subsequently decaying into a remnant low-pressure area at around 1200 UTC on June 12 while located about 585 mi (940 km) southwest of the southernmost tip of Baja California peninsula. Devoid of any convection, the remnant low of Adrian continued to move west for roughly two days, until gradual dissipation, as the low-level circulation opened up into a surface though.

Preparations and impact
As Adrian became a major hurricane off the coastline of Mexico, a tropical storm watch was issued by the National Weather Service of Mexico along the coast of southwestern Mexico spanning from Acapulco to Punta San Telmo. The tropical storm watch was in effect at 1500 UTC on June 8 and discontinued at 0300 UTC on June 9. Despite these watches, no tropical storm force winds were observed on the coast of Mexico. The National Weather Service of Mexico also issued heavy rain alerts for Colima, Michoacán and Guerrero. The Mexican civil defense system declared a green alert (low risk) for these three states. In addition, a blue alert (minimal risk) was issued for coast of Nayarit and Oaxaca.

Plumes of moisture from the outer rainbands of Adrian caused heavy rain in the Mexican states of Oaxaca, Guerrero and Michoacán. Similarly, a weather station at Tequisistlán, Oaxaca recorded  of rainfall accumulation. Ships traveling within the vicinity of Adrian were advised to take extreme caution as Adrian paralleled the Mexican coastline. Overall, Adrian had limited effects on land since it stayed in the open Pacific waters, thus there were no reports of notable damage or casualties as a result of Adrian.

See also

 2011 Pacific hurricane season
 Timeline of the 2011 Pacific hurricane season
 Hurricane Annette (1976)
 Other storms of the same name

References

External links

 National Hurricane Center
 National Hurricane Center's advisory archive on Hurricane Adrian
 National Hurricane Center's graphical archive on Hurricane Adrian
 

Adrian
Adrian
Adrian